Salve Deus Rex Judaeorum (Latin: Hail, God, King of the Jews) is a volume of poems by English poet Emilia Lanier published in 1611. It was the first book of original poetry published by a woman in England. It was also the first book of poetry written by an English woman in an effort to attract a patron. The volume contains several short poems, each dedicated to a different woman, a long title poem Salve Deus Rex Judaeorum and the first English country house poem entitled "The Description of Cooke-ham".

Poems

Contents 
To the Queenes Most Excellent Majestie
To the Lady Elizabeths Grace
To All Vertuous Ladies in Generall
To the Ladie Arabella
To the Ladie Susan
The Authors Dream to the Lady Marie
To the Ladie Lucie
To the Ladie Margaret
To the Ladie Katherine
To the Ladie Anne
To the Vertuous Reader (prose)
Eve's Apology in Defense of Women
Salve Deus Rex Judaeorum
The Description of Cooke-ham
To the Doubtfull Reader (prose)

Description 
As their titles suggest, the ten prefatory poems were each dedicated to a woman Lanier was inspired by, influenced by, or hoped to attract as a patron. These dedications were used to "assert the dignity and merit of all women" by declaring the greatness of the women she wrote to.

The title poem is a significantly longer work that focuses on the crucifixion of Jesus, a defence of women, and the importance of woman in the Biblical crucifixion narrative. Suzanne Woods observes that the poem is "meditating and expanding on the events from the female point of view," which was a revolutionary retelling of the crucifixion at the time.

Lanier's defense of women shifts the blame of sin from Eve and onto Adam saying, "But surely Adam cannot be excus'd, / Her fault, though great, yet he was most too blame" The poem goes on to explain that Adam should have avoided temptation since he is depicted as stronger than Eve in the Bible. Lanier strengthens her defence of women by praising the women in the crucifixion story who stood behind Jesus when his disciples forsook him. For example, Lanier's focus on Pilate's wife, a woman who attempts to persuade her husband not to crucify Jesus, shows Lanier's dedication to the recognition of women in the Bible even if they are nameless. Lanier's attention to the women in the poem characterizes her unique retelling of the biblical story.

Salve Deus Rex Judaeorum is also noteworthy because, at the time of its writing, there were no other women who were writing about religious texts in the same way as Lanier. The Poetry Foundation states, "Apart from these English psalm translations, there was one other notable work of religious verse written before Lanyer's." Therefore, Lanier's Salve Deus Rex Judaeorum was groundbreaking in the theological genre of poetry as well as English literature as a whole.

Reception 
There is no indication of any recognition of Salve Deus Rex Judaeorum in Lanier's lifetime. It did not gain Lanier a fortune as her attempt to attract a patron suggests she wanted. The collection appears to have had an underwhelming reception due to the nontraditional nature of the poems. The British Library explains the writing by stating, "Lanier uses the language of piety and respect to mount a radical, self-assured 'defence of Women'. The feminist style that scholars and researchers like those at the British Library attribute to Lanier is probably one of the reasons Salve "Deus Rex Judaeorum" was not well received.

Lanier's Salve Deus Rex Judaeorum was, for the most part, forgotten for centuries. One scholar says, "["Salve Deus Rex Judeaorum" was] consigned to oblivion for nearly four centuries, Lanyer has only in recent decades become the focus of a significant body of critical scholarship and achieved a presence in the mainstream of Renaissance poetry."

Although the reception to Salve Deus Rex Judaeorum was poor, the work has come to claim an important place in the history of English literature. By the account of most scholars, researchers, and biographers Lanier's collection of poems was a groundbreaking text for feminism, literary tradition, and poetry overall. Salve Deus Rex Judeaorum was indeed forgotten for centuries, but it has finally achieved recognition thanks to carefully edited editions like that of Suzanne Woods and journal articles including "Remembering Aemilia Lanyer" by Kate Chedgzoy.

References

External links
Full text of Salve Deus Rex Iudæorum
 

1611 books
1611 poems
Cultural depictions of the Passion of Jesus
English poetry collections
Depictions of Jesus in literature